Half a House is a 1976 American comedy film directed by Brice Mack, produced by Lenke Romanszky and released theatrically in the U.S. by Rampart Releasing. It stars Anthony Eisley and Pat Delaney as a separated married couple who divide up living space when they must share their house for three months. The film was also released as House Divided.

Cast
 Anthony Eisley as Jordan Blake
 Pat Delaney as Bitsy Blake
 Francine York as Jessica
 Kaz Garas as Lt. Artie
 Mary Grace Canfield as Thelma
 Angus Duncan as Craig

Awards
Composer Sammy Fain and lyricist Paul Francis Webster were nominated for the Academy Award for Best Original Song for "A World That Never Was." Producer Lenke Romanszky said the primary reason for booking the film in a Beverly Hills theater in 1976 was to qualify the song for Oscars. Prints of the film were scarce and a commercial record was not available, so Fain and Webster set up a phone number with a recording of the song to allow Academy members to call in and hear it. Eddie Albert performed the song on the 49th Academy Awards telecast.

See also
 List of American films of 1976

References

External links
 

1976 films
1976 comedy films
Films about dysfunctional families
Films directed by Brice Mack
1970s English-language films
American comedy films
1970s American films